Louis Jean Baptiste Bergeron (10 March 1876 – 23 February 1948) was a French entrepreneur, engineer and inventor.

Bergeron was born in Lagnieu. In 1900, he started work as an electrical engineer and made a career in the Farcot company in St Ouen, a factory of steam engines and high-power electrical machines. In 1918, together with Beaudrey, he co-founded the company Beaudrey-Bergeron, which later, after a friendly split with Beaudrey, became Bergeron S.A., now part of Alstom.

He is remembered for his practical, mathematical methodology to study water hammer in hydraulic pipe systems which he also showed to be useful in the study of electromagnetic voltage/current surges in electricity systems. His last work From water hammer in hydraulics to lightning surges in electricity, published posthumously, became a reference work in electrical engineering.

In electrical engineering, application of so-called "Bergeron equations" allows the calculation of travelling wave phenomena in "long" conductors using numerical analysis. Hermann W. Dommel used these "Bergeron equations" in the EMTP (electromagnetic transient program) software in the late 1960s.

See also 
Bergeron diagram

References 

1876 births
1948 deaths
People from Lagnieu
French electrical engineers
20th-century French inventors
20th-century French businesspeople
Place of death missing